The Linking Victoria was a State Government program launched in 1999 by the Premier, Steve Bracks, to upgrade transport infrastructure in Victoria, Australia. If implemented, the estimate cost of the program would have been $3.5 billion, including improvements to road, rail and port networks.

Elements
Elements of the program included:

 an airport rail link from Melbourne Airport into central Melbourne. Funds were committed in 2017/18 by State and Federal governments for preparation of a business case.
 Regional Fast Rail project upgrading passenger rail links in regional Victoria, completed in 2009.
 reinstating country passenger rail services, including those to Bairnsdale, Ararat, Leongatha and Mildura. The latter two projects were deferred and ultimately cancelled.
 Geelong Freeway upgrade.
 standardisation of railway gauges (deferred, and partially restarted in 2008).
 Eastern Freeway extension to Ringwood. Completed in 2008.
 duplication of the Calder Highway to Bendigo. Completed on 20 April 2009.
 accident blackspot road safety program.
 development of the Port of Melbourne, constructing the Dock Link Road, investigating reinstatement of the Webb Dock railway line.
 joint private/public sector major redevelopment of Spencer Street station.

See also
List of Victoria Government Infrastructure Plans, Proposals and Studies

References

External links
 www.linkingvictoria.vic.gov.au - official site

Transport in Victoria (Australia)
Rail transport in Victoria (Australia)